The Universal History (complete title: An Universal history, from the earliest account of time. Compiled from original authors; and illustrated with maps, cuts, notes, &c. With a general index to the whole.) was a 65-volume universal history of the world published in London between 1747 and 1768.  Contributors included George Sale, George Psalmanazar, Archibald Bower, George Shelvocke, John Campbell and John Swinton. The novelist Tobias Smollett edited for a short period.

It was one of the first works to attempt to unify the history of Western Europe with the stories of the world's other known cultures.
As a major historical synthesis on, among other subjects, European colonial activities during the modern era, the Modern Part of an Universal History (1754–65) can be considered, according to one specialist, Guido Abbattista, as a precursor of the famous abbé Guillaume Raynal's
Histoire des deux Indes (1770–80), of which it was one of the most important, even if not acknowledged, sources.

References

Further reading
See the works by Guido Abbattista (University of Trieste, Italy):
 The literary mill: per una storia editoriale della Universal History (1736–1765), Studi Settecenteschi, 1981, pp. 91–133
 The business of Paternoster Row: towards a publishing history of the Universal History, Publishing History (Cambridge, UK-Alexandria, Virginia), XVII, 1985, pp. 5–50
 Un dibattito settecentesco sulla storia universale (Ricerche sulle traduzioni e sulla circolazione della Universal History), in Rivista storica italiana, a. CI, f. III, 1989, pp. 614–695
 “The English Universal History: publishing, authorship and historiography in a European project (1736–1790)”, Paper for the Aachen conference on “Weltgeshichten/Geschicthswelten. Universalgeschichte in der Frühen Neuzeit“, Historikertag Aachen September 2000, then in Storia della Storiografia, 39 (2001): 103-108
 Chapters of Abbattista's volume on Commercio, colonie e impero alla vigilia della Rivoluzione americana. John Campbell pubblicista e storico nell’Inghilterra del sec. XVIII, Firenze, Olschki, 1990, are dedicated to the large sections of the Universal History on the European expansion and colonialism overseas

External links
 

Universal history books
18th-century history books